Pierre Dharréville (born 15 June 1975) is a French politician. Since 18 June 2017, he serves as the member of the National Assembly for the 13th district of the Bouches-du-Rhône, which includes Martigues.

References

1975 births
Living people
People from Nanterre
French Communist Party politicians
Deputies of the 15th National Assembly of the French Fifth Republic
University of Montpellier alumni
Members of Parliament for Bouches-du-Rhône
Deputies of the 16th National Assembly of the French Fifth Republic